Bezirk Vöcklabruck is a district of the state of 
Upper Austria in Austria.

Municipalities
Towns (Städte) are indicated in boldface; market towns (Marktgemeinden) in italics; suburbs, hamlets and other subdivisions of a municipality are indicated in small characters.

 
Districts of Upper Austria